The Miami County Courthouse is an historic building in Troy, Ohio, United States.  Built in 1885, it was designed by noted Ohio (and later New York) architect Joseph W. Yost, who also designed the similar Belmont County Courthouse built at the same time in St. Clairsville. It has high arched windows and Corinthian columns supporting the outthrust corners and main entrance. A flight of stairs runs to the main entrance. The central pediment rests on an arch supported by Corinthian columns. The corners of the building thrust out and support a pediment, on top of each rests a tower crowned with an urn-shaped finial. A central tower rises from the middle of the building supporting the clock tower and dome, and a statue of justice stands at the very top.

On May 30, 1975, the courthouse along with the power station to the north were added to the National Register of Historic Places as the Miami County Courthouse and Power Station.

See also
Belmont County Courthouse
Joseph W. Yost

References

Further reading
County Courthouses of Ohio by Susan W. Thrane
County Records of Miami County, Ohio Miami County, Ohio

Courthouses on the National Register of Historic Places in Ohio
Buildings and structures in Miami County, Ohio
National Register of Historic Places in Miami County, Ohio
County courthouses in Ohio
Clock towers in Ohio
Government buildings completed in 1885
1885 establishments in Ohio